Aphaenops bouilloni is a species of ground beetle in the Trechinae subfamily. It was described by Henri Coiffait in 1955.

References

bouilloni
Beetles described in 1955